"Available" is a song by Canadian singer Justin Bieber from his fifth studio album, Changes (2020).

Critical reception
Michael Cragg from The Observer branded the song as "tactile." Annie Zaleski of The A.V. Club panned the "rattling trap rhythms" of the song.

Music video
On March 10, 2020, an accompanying nature visual for "Available" was released exclusively for Apple Music subscribers. Simultaneously, a preview of the video was shared by Apple Music and Bieber, respectively, via Twitter. The visual stood as the fourth and final video of Bieber's Apple Music "Nature" series. Within the music video, Bieber plays a piano covered with graffiti in the middle of a landscape surrounded by mountains and red-tinged skies, with his surroundings being described as "a desert-like setting." Street-art-style animation is included, reminiscent of the piano's style.

Later a dance video for "Available" was published as a part of the project "CHANGES: The Movement"

Charts

References

2020 songs
Justin Bieber songs
Songs written by Justin Bieber
Songs written by Poo Bear
2020 singles